The 1st Grande Prêmio Cinema Brasil ceremony, presented by the Ministry of Culture of Brazil, honored the best audiovisual productions of 1999.  It took place on February 12, 2000, at the Palácio Quitandinha in the city of Petrópolis, Rio de Janeiro. During the ceremony, the Ministry of Culture presented the Grande Prêmio Cinema Brasil in 17 categories. The ceremony, televised by TV Cultura and Televisão Educativa, was directed by José Possi Neto and hosted by actress Regina Casé.

The film O Primeiro Dia (Midnight) was nominated for nine awards (the most of any film), followed by Orfeu with seven nominations.  O Primeiro Dia and Orfeu tied for the most awards won, with three each.  Other film winners included Nós que Aqui Estamos por Vós Esperamos with two awards, and Por Trás do Pano, Outras Estórias and Dois Córregos with one each.

Background
After a decree during the administration of President Fernando Collor de Mello abolished government support of cinema production, almost no films were domestically produced in the early 1990s.  In 1991, only one percent of films on screen in Brazil were produced in the country, and in 1992 only two Brazilian films were released. In 1993 (after Collor's impeachment), the government enacted a tax incentive for film production, and the "Retomada" (lit. "Resumption"), a film renaissance, began. As of 1998, five percent of films in cinemas were Brazilian.  The Ministry of Culture of Brazil established the national film awards in November 1999 to recognize works and individuals in the audiovisual area; 16 categories and a special award were created.  With the awards, the Ministry of Culture aimed to foster the retomada by increasing domestic audiences; their goal was for 20% of films in Brazil to be produced domestically as of 2002.

Ceremony
The ceremony was held on February 12, 2000, beginning at 9:27 p.m. BRT.  It took place at the Palácio Quitandinha, a former luxury resort hotel in Petrópolis, State of Rio de Janeiro, Brazil. Televised by TV Cultura and Televisão Educativa, the ceremony was directed by José Possi Neto and hosted by actress Regina Casé. The ceremony started with a montage of important scenes of Brazilian production over the years. The presentation of awards followed, interspersed with live musical performances by the Best Score nominees and homages to actresses Fernanda Montenegro, Vera Fischer, and Zezé Motta and filmmakers Anselmo Duarte and Joaquim Pedro de Andrade.

Winners and nominees
On December 8, 1999, the nominees for six categories of the 1st Grande Prêmio Cinema Brasil were announced at Brasília. These categories were Best Film, Best Foreign Language Film, Best Director, Best Actor, Best Actress and Best Television Series. The nominees for the other 11 categories were announced on January 20, 2000. The films receiving the most nominations were O Primeiro Dia with nine and Orfeu with seven. The winners were announced during the awards ceremony on February 12, 2000.

Awards

Winners are listed first and highlighted in boldface.

Multiple nominations and awards

The following eleven films received multiple nominations.
 Nine: O Primeiro Dia
 Seven: Orfeu
 Six: Um Copo de Cólera
 Four: Outras Estórias and Por Trás do Pano
 Three: Dois Córregos
 Two: Amor & Cia, Até que a Vida Nos Separe, Corazón iluminado, Nós que aqui Estamos por Vós Esperamos and Traição

The following three films received multiple awards.
 Three: Orfeu and O Primeiro Dia
 Two: Nós que Aqui Estamos por Vós Esperamos

See also

 List of Brazilian films of the 1990s
 2000 in film

Notes

References

2000 film awards
2000 in Brazil